The Ambassador is a British television drama series produced by the BBC and created by Hugh Costello.

The series starred Pauline Collins in the title role as Harriet Smith, the new British ambassador to Ireland and dealt with the personal and professional pressures in her life, as well as wider political themes. Other notable cast members were Denis Lawson and Peter Egan.

Cast and characters

Main
 Pauline Collins as Harriet Smith, the British Ambassador to Ireland. Harriet continually tries to maintain the pressures of her personal and private life whilst trying to move on from her guilt regarding the murder of her husband, David, who was killed by a car bomb intended for Harriet.
 Denis Lawson as John Stone, Commercial Attaché for the British Ambassador to Ireland and a clandestine operative for MI6. He is affectionately nicknamed "Spook" by Harriet.

Recurring
 Owen Roe as Kevin Flaherty, the Minister for External Affairs.
 William Chubb as Stephen Tyler, the Deputy British Ambassador to Ireland.
 Tom Connolly as Sam Smith, the 13-year-old son of Harriet Smith.
 Alison McKenna as Jennifer, Personal Assistant to the British Ambassador (Series 1)
 Sara Markland as Becky (Series 1)
 Dominic Mafham as Julian Wadham (Series 1)
 Tim Matthews as Nate Smith, the 19-year-old son of Harriet Smith and a second-year politics student at Trinity College in Dublin. (Series 1)
 Peter Egan as Michael Cochrane, CEO of Cochrane Construction and Harriet's lover (Series 2)
 Eve Matheson as Catherine Grieve, the Consul General of the British Embassy in Dublin. (Series 2)
 Gina Moxley as Eileen (Series 2)

Episodes

Series 1 (1998)

Series 2 (1999)

References

External links

BBC television dramas
1990s British drama television series
1998 British television series debuts
1999 British television series endings
English-language television shows